Wesley H. "Wes" Richardson (March 20, 1930 – April 16, 2011) was a Canadian curler. He played lead for the "World famous Richardsons", winning three of their four Briers and World Curling Championships.

The team consisted of two brothers (skip Ernie and Garnet and their two cousins, Arnold and Wes). As a member of the team, Wes won the 1959, 1960, and 1962 Briers as well as their corresponding Scotch Cups (the World Championship at the time). Wes left the team for the 1962-63 season, due to a back injury, and was replaced by Mel Perry. He returned to the team in 1964.

He was inducted (together with all of "Team Richardson") into the World Curling Federation Hall of Fame in 2017, the Canadian Sports Hall of Fame (1968; the first curling team inducted to this Hall of Fame) and the Canadian Curling Hall of Fame (1973).

Richardson retired to Hawaii, where he was an active cyclist and marathon runner. He died of prostate cancer on April 16, 2011.

References

Sources

Wesley Richardson – Curling Canada Stats Archive
The Curling Richardsons - The Team
 Video: 

1930 births
Curlers from Saskatchewan
World curling champions
Brier champions
Canadian male curlers
2011 deaths
Canadian emigrants to the United States